Naugatuck River Review (NRR) is a national literary magazine named after the Naugatuck River in Connecticut. Founded in 2008, it publishes narrative poetry. The headquarters is in Westfield, Massachusetts.

Awards
Each year Naugatuck River Review hosts a Narrative Poetry Prize. NRR subscribes to the ethical code for contests laid out by the Council of Literary Magazines and Presses.  The judge for the 2012 prize is Pamela Uschuk. Past judges have included Patricia Smith, Patrick Donnelly, and Lesléa Newman.

Past contributors
Edward Byrne, Ernie Wormwood, Laurie Junkins, José Gouveia, Steven Riel, Terry Lucas, Wyn Cooper, Diane Lockward, Alan King, Laurie Ann Guerrero, Sally Rosen Kindred, Marie-Elizabeth Mali, Naomi Benaron, José B. Gonzalez, Monica Hand, Daniel Nathan Terry, Taylor Mali, Richard Vargas, Tim Mayo, Marge Piercy, Truth Thomas, Janet Jennings, Christel Warren, Monica A. Hand, Lyn Lifshin, Lucille Lang Day, and Tara Betts.

See also
List of literary magazines

References

External links
Naugatuck River Review website
Poets & Writers NRR page

Poetry magazines published in the United States
Biannual magazines published in the United States
Magazines established in 2008
Magazines published in Massachusetts